Nightmare and the Cat was a five-piece British-American indie rock band that formed in 2010.  The band consisted of Django Stewart (vocals), Samuel Stewart (guitar), Claire Acey (vocals), Scott Henson (bass) and Spike Phillips (drums).

History
The band was formed in Los Angeles by brothers Samuel Stewart and Django Stewart, sons of musician/producer Dave Stewart and Siobhan Fahey. Samuel and Django had both been involved in previous bands in London and Los Angeles, including Blondelle and Django James and the Midnight Squires, respectively.

The band built a considerable following on YouTube posting covers and acoustic performances. The band self released the Nightmare and the Cat EP and soon garnered the attraction of major management companies and labels, signing with In De Goot Entertainment in 2011 who found them a home at Capitol Records in 2013.  Their debut release Simple EP, produced by Eric Valentine was released on Capitol Records on September 17, 2013. The band collaborates with artist Gary Baseman in their artwork and some live performances. They are looking forward to the release of their first LP, also titled Simple, in July 2014. On May 15, 2014 Nightmare and the Cat performed "Undercover" on The Late Show with David Letterman.

On October 28, 2015 Django took to Facebook to announce that Nightmare and the Cat "is no more".

Touring
In 2013 the band toured across the United States supporting label mates Bastille with Little Daylight. In 2014 they were on tour supporting Neon Trees with Smallpools.

Band members
 Django Stewart – lead vocals, tambourine
 Samuel Stewart – guitar
 Claire Acey – backing vocals, guitar, drums
 Scott Henson – bass guitar
 Brandon "Spike" Philips  – drums
 Julie Mitchell – bass guitar

Discography

Singles 

 Undercover - Capitol Records (2014)

EPs
 Nightmare and the Cat EP - Self Released (12 July 2011)
 Simple EP - Capitol Records (17 September 2013)

LPs
 Simple - Capitol Records (22 July 2014)

References

External links
 
 

Indie rock musical groups from California
Musical groups from Los Angeles
Capitol Records artists
Musical groups established in 2010
2010 establishments in California